Ditty is the surname of:

 Herbert Ditty (died 1998), Ulster Unionist politician and Lord Mayor of Belfast, Northern Ireland
 James S. Ditty (1880–1962), American photo-engraver and entrepreneur
 Julie Ditty (born 1979), American tennis player

See also
 Diddy (disambiguation)